White Denim is an American four-piece rock band from Austin, Texas, United States. Their music is influenced by dub, psychedelic rock, blues, punk rock, progressive rock, soul, jazz, experimental rock with home-based recording, jamming approach, intense looping work and unusual song structures.

History
In March 2005, two bands, Parque Touch (Josh Block, James Petralli, Lucas Anderson) and Peach Train (Steve Terebecki), played a show together at Beerland in Austin, Texas. After the show Steve was asked to play bass for Parque Touch and the band became four, playing under the pseudonyms Byshop Massive (Lucas), Bop English (James), Nicholas Mallard (Josh), and Terry Beckins (Steve); however, in February 2006, Lucas moved to Russia and the resulting power trio changed its name to White Denim. The new line-up began playing the local Austin circuit while recording punk-infused, psychedelic blues-rock in Block's 1940s Spartan trailer.

In 2007, the band self-released its first EP entitled Let's Talk About It on 7" only, but later these tracks became available on iTunes. While on tour in 2007, the band recorded a nine-song "tour EP" entitled Workout Holiday, which was only sold at shows. Workout Holiday caught the ear of new netlabel RCRD LBL, and the band signed on to re-record three of the songs. These songs were exclusively released as the RCRD LBL EP, one MP3 track at a time over the course of the first few months of 2008.

Since these releases, the band has toured extensively, playing shows including SXSW and CMJ Music Marathon, and also received the award of "Best New Band" at the 2008 Austin Music Awards. In order to reach European listeners, the band signed to UK record label Full Time Hobby (home to The Hold Steady and Viva Voce) for an overseas release. The first release on Full Time Hobby was the single "Let's Talk About It" b/w "Darksided Computer Mouth". On June 23, 2008, the band released its debut album, the Workout Holiday LP, which consists of re-recorded songs from the band's first two self-released EPs along with some new tracks. The band later released two more singles in Europe from Workout Holiday: "All You Really Have To Do" b/w "DCWYW" and "Shake Shake Shake" b/w "All Truckers Roll".

Back in the U.S., White Denim released their debut U.S. full-length LP, entitled Exposion in late 2008. Originally sold during their Spring 2008 tour as a CD-R with the title 11 Songs, the album was made available in digital format from their official website on October 19, 2008. The band teamed up with Austin's Transmission Entertainment for the distribution of Exposion in the US; however, the two parted ways in mid-2009.

White Denim's third full-length album, Fits, was released via Full Time Hobby on June 22, 2009. The record was initially released in Europe only, but after signing their first US record deal with Downtown Records on July 10, the band release Fits on October 20, 2009. This album was also packaged with Exposion as a bonus disc, giving the band's second LP a proper US release.

In September 2010 White Denim announced the addition of second guitarist Austin Jenkins to the band's line-up. On September 23, 2010, the band self-released a collection of 12 tracks under the title Last Day of Summer. The release notes state "This record is something we made as a little summer retreat from our ongoing work on the third full length. Many of these tunes have been bouncing around since the formation of the band back in 06. We were super pumped to utilize a few fresh and casual musical approaches on this record.". It was initially available to download for free (with an option to make a donation) from the band's official website, but on December 5, 2011, it was released by Downtown Records on CD and LP.

On May 24, 2011, White Denim released their fourth studio album D on Downtown Records. The first leg of White Denim's For D tour started on May 23 in Sail Inn, Tempe.

In 2012, White Denim opened for Wilco on their Jan-Feb west coast tour and played at the 2012 Bonnaroo Music & Arts Festival and Outside Lands festival.

In 2015, James Petralli released his first solo album, Constant Bop, under his pseudonym, Bop English. Guitarist Austin Jenkins and drummer Josh Block left the band that summer to work on other projects - guitarist Jonathan Horne and drummer Jeffrey Olson filled their spots.

On 7 January 2016, White Denim announced that their new album, Stiff, would be released on 25 March 2016 via Downtown/Sony Red, with the track "Holda You (I'm Psycho)" shared on their SoundCloud. A second track, "Ha Ha Ha Ha (Yeah)", was released on 1 February 2016. On
October 20, 2016, the song was used in the reveal trailer for the Nintendo Switch.

On May 9, 2018, the band announced their eighth full-length album, Performance, scheduled for release on August 28 via City Slang Records. The announcement was accompanied by the album's lead single, "Magazin," and followed by a second single, "It Might Get Dark," on June 12.

On March 29, 2019, the band released the follow up to Performance, called Side Effects. Then, on October 29 of the same year, they released a live album, In Person.

On March 14, 2020, the group announced that they intended to write, record and release a new album by April 17 that year.

Members
James Petralli – vocals, guitar
Steve Terebecki - bass
Michael Hunter – keyboards
Cat Clemons - guitar
Matt Young - drums

Discography

 Workout Holiday (2008)
 Exposion (2008)
 Fits (2009)
 Last Day of Summer (2010)
 D (2011)
 Corsicana Lemonade (2013)
 Stiff (2016)
 Performance (2018)
 Side Effects (2019)
 World as a Waiting Room (2020)
 Crystal Bullets / King Tears (2021)

References

External links
Official website
Spin Magazine, Interview: Artist of the Day, November 26, 2007.
La Blogotheque, Gig review: White Denim & the Hype, April 8, 2008.

Indie rock musical groups from Texas
Musical groups from Austin, Texas
Musical groups established in 2006
2006 establishments in Texas
Downtown Records artists
MapleMusic Recordings artists
City Slang artists
Full Time Hobby artists